"No Reason" is the twenty-fourth episode and the season finale of the second season of House. It premiered on Fox on May 23, 2006. The episode features creator David Shore's directorial debut.

Plot
As House and his team work on the diagnosis of Vincent, a man with a massively swollen tongue and a high temperature, a disgruntled former patient named Jack Moriarty walks into House's office and shoots House twice with a handgun. Vincent develops two additional symptoms: blood leaking into his left eye, causing it to swell outward (and eventually be removed), and a burst testicle. The symptoms appear to have no possible connection to each other.

Waking up from a coma two days later, House continues to treat Vincent from his hospital bed in the ICU with Moriarty, shot by hospital security and handcuffed to his bed, as his roommate. House wakes up Moriarty and asks why he wanted him to die. Moriarty replies that it was not his intention to kill House, and that he wanted to see House suffer. The reason Moriarty wanted to see House suffer was because his wife was a recent patient that House previously treated. While diagnosing her, House badgered Moriarty until he admitted that he had cheated on her. Despite this fact having no medical relevance to his wife's illness, House told her about the affair anyway. Moriarty's wife then committed suicide shortly after being released from the hospital. He tells House that he realizes that his affair led to his wife's suicide, however he feels that House should take part of the blame because there was "no reason" to tell her about it.

Since the shooting, House feels decreased pain in his leg. He finds out from his records that during the surgery to treat the gunshot wounds, a treatment of ketamine to induce a coma had been given to relieve his leg pain, but he experiences neurological side effects. It becomes clear that House cannot separate fact from fiction, as hallucinations begin to get a stronger grasp on his sense of reality, from hitting Wilson to eating tacos outside the hospital. He begins to question his own ability to diagnose, while hostility increases between him and Moriarty. As Vincent’s body begins to deteriorate, House struggles through his own self-doubts and must try to make sense of his life and world.

House is seen hallucinating sitting in the passenger seat of Moriarty's wife's car next to her as she commits suicide by carbon monoxide poisoning (by starting her car with the garage door closed). House comes back to his hospital room from his daydreams and with sincerity tells Moriarty "I'm sorry."

After several hallucinations, House determines that nothing he has experienced since the shooting is real, and in order to snap out of his hallucination, decides to kill Vincent with the facility's surgical robot. House theorizes that doing this will push his mind past the point of reality and force it to believe the truth - that he is hallucinating. This is further proven when House's team tries to stop him from even using the robot, seemingly knowing he is going to kill Vincent; something that would not be possible unless everything he is experiencing is in his own mind.

The surgical robot tears into Vincent and his vital signs disappear. At first, it seems House really killed him, but then Vincent drops a bullet he held in his hand. This is all the proof House needs that everything was just a hallucination, and he says "goodbye" before snapping back into reality. His theory proves to be true, and in the final minutes of the episode we see House being rushed into the ER moments after he was shot. Before the episode ends, House asks Cameron to tell Cuddy that he wants ketamine, which he supposedly received prior to the imagined events of the episode.

Reception

Ratings
The episode received 25.47 million viewers in its original broadcasting and ranked third that week.

References

External links

 "No Reason" at Fox.com
 

House (season 2) episodes
2006 American television episodes
Fiction with unreliable narrators

fr:House à terre
it:Episodi di Dr. House - Medical Division (seconda stagione)#Mr. Jekyll e Dr. House